is an action role-playing game developed by Nextech and published by Sega for the PlayStation 2, and the 19th game in the Shining video game series. It was released on May 17, 2007 in Japan. The game is the sequel to Shining Tears. The main characters from Shining Tears appear in Shining Wind as well. An anime adaptation of the two games, called Shining Tears X Wind, began airing in early April 2007. Like Shining Tears, the game is illustrated by artist Tony Taka.

Characters

Real World

 - Touka is a grade 12 student and also the student council secretary of her school. Representing beauty and wisdom, she is considered the "idol" in her school. She is a gentle and polite girl; she always shows kindness to everyone, but when she meets something unreasonable she rejects it resolutely; in fact she is terrible when she is angry. She is a miko and was born into a shrine family ; she is good at the art of kyūdō and spells, but cooking is not her strong point. The school in which she studies was built by her grandfather, and her mother is the director general of this school.

 - A student who belongs to the Student Council.

 - A seemingly innocent and quiet girl who is devoted to Saionji.

Soul Bladers

 - An athletic student who, along with Kureha, was transported to the dream continent, End Earth.

 - A quiet and shy student.
/
 - An heir to a rich family and Student Council President.

End Earth

Liberia

Demonic Alchemy Empire Baelgard (Elven Kingdom Astraea)

 - One of Baelgard's four guardians.

 - One of Baelgard's four guardians. Originally a normal and kind elf, until he was infected by the darkness.

 - One of Baelgard's four guardians.

Holy Kingdom Philias

 - Princess and Priestess of Philias' Tower of the Sun.

 - Prince of Philias, thus the future king, and Clalaclan's younger brother.

 - A mysterious birdman.

 - Priest of Philias.

United Trading Nation Seiran

 - The King of Seiran. Before becoming king, he was the captain of a pirate crew, but his great conviction and good heart made him win the trust of the beastmen.

 - The Priestess of Seiran's Tower of Rain Water.

 - Chancellor of Seiran.

 - One of Seiran's five generals. A quiet centaurian warrior. He acts as King Rouen's scout.

 - One of Seiran's five generals. A bird-like warrior.

 - One of Seiran's five generals. He was ordered to watch over Houmei.

 - One of Seiran's five generals. A bow-wielding turtle-like warrior. When sober, he is very understanding, however, when he is drunk, he fights others for no apparent reason.

 - One of Seiran's five generals. A tiger-like warrior, who is a good friend of Hyouun. He is very proud of his skills as a warrior.

Valeria

Mercenary Knighthood Weissritter
Zero (Formerly Xion)
 - Zero is Xion, or what is left of his soul. His angelic wings represent the two entities inside his body, the black one resembles Zeroboros, the white one resembles what is left of Xion, but for all causes, Xion no longer exists.

 - A quarter-beast; she has a pair of cat-like ears. She is also the Princess of Bestia.

 - An old friend of Zero from the Elf race, and is also the princess of Fontina.

 - An old friend of Zero and an Ice Sorceress, who lives in an ice house and showers with ice. She is also the princess of Runevale. She is considered a beauty, but is often cold toward others.

 - A priestess of Etwarl Shrine.

 - A Dragonian tribesman who is also a close friend to Ryuna, who acknowledged Zero's intentions.

Others
/

Music
"Heart-shaped chant"
Lyrics by: Nana Mizuki
Composition and arrangement by: Noriyasu Agematsu (Elements Garden)
Song by: Nana Mizuki (published in the single "SECRET AMBITION")

Reception

The game was released on Japan on May 17, 2007, and sold over 78,000 units in four days, becoming the top selling game in the country in that week.

According to the 2006 hands-on preview from IGN, the game runs at constant 60 frames per second.

Other media
A game OST was released on May 31, 2007. It features the theme song, Heart-Shaped Chant, by Nana Mizuki.

References

External links

Role-playing video games
Amusement Vision games
Nex Entertainment games
PlayStation 2 games
PlayStation 2-only games
Japan-exclusive video games
Action role-playing video games
Shining (series)
2007 video games
Video games developed in Japan